Chaeremon of Alexandria (fl. 1st century AD) was a Stoic philosopher and historian who wrote on Egyptian mythology from a "typically Stoic" perspective. All of Chaeremon's works are lost, though a number of fragments are quoted by later authors. Three titles are preserved: the History of Egypt, Hieroglyphika, and On Comets, with another fragment quoted from an unknown grammatical treatise of his. According to the Suda, he was the head of the Alexandrian school of grammarians, and he may also have been head of the Museion. 

He was probably one of the ambassadors to Claudius from Alexandria in 40 AD. He also taught Nero, probably before 49 AD when Seneca the Younger became Nero's tutor. He may have been the grandson of the Chaeremon who accompanied the Roman prefect Aelius Gallus on his tour of Egypt in 26 AD. His father – about whom nothing is known – was called Leonidas, and he was probably born no later than 10 AD. 

One of the poems from Martial's eleventh book of Epigrams mocks Chaeremon; as Martial did not usually attack living figures Chaeremon presumably died before 96 AD when Epigrams XI was published.

Notes

Editions and Translations
Pieter van der Horst includes 14 certain and 14 doubtful fragments in his edition of Chaeramon's works:

References
 

1st-century philosophers
1st-century Egyptian people
Roman-era librarians of Alexandria
Roman-era Stoic philosophers
Year of birth unknown
Year of death unknown
Ancient Alexandrians